The Barbate is a coastal river in southern Spain. It flows into the Atlantic Ocean at Barbate (the town after which it is named) in the province of Cádiz, autonomous community of Andalusia.

The upper portion of the river descends rapidly, running through Triassic terrain, and dropping  in barely ; after that, the river descends gently over Eocene terrain, losing only  in the rest of its course, which after the confluence with the river Alberite flows through Quaternary terrain.

The Barbate and its tributaries drain an area of  (17.6 percent of the province of Cádiz). It runs through wide colluvial plains and the magnificent dark clay soils the Spanish call bujeo or the tierras negras andaluzas ("black Andalusian lands"), arriving finally in the desiccated former Janda Lagoon, where the River Almodóvar flows into the Barbate from the left. Other tributaries are the Rocinejo, the Celemín (river), the Álamo and the Fraja.

Geography of the Province of Cádiz
Rivers of Andalusia
Rivers of Spain